Alexander Wicksteed (6 September 1875 – 30 July 1935) was an English traveller and writer from St Pancras, London. Wicksteed, a Quaker, originally went to assist with famine relief. He lived in Soviet Russia in the years after the October Revolution, and is best known for his books based on that period, Life Under the Soviets (1928) and Ten Years in Soviet Moscow (1933). He was a friend and travelling companion of the American journalist Negley Farson, and the two travelled together through the western Caucasus in 1929. Farson dedicated his book Caucasian Journey to Wicksteed.

After 15 years in the Soviet Union, Wicksteed died in Moscow of chronic bronchitis after a weeklong illness.

References

1875 births
1935 deaths
English writers
British expatriates in Russia
English Quakers
People from St Pancras, London
Royal Naval Reserve personnel